KRMD-FM (101.1 MHz, "Country 101.1 FM") is a contemporary country music formatted radio station licensed to Oil City, Louisiana, United States, and serving the Shreveport-Bossier City Metropolitan Area. The station is owned by Cumulus Media and based at the Louisiana Boardwalk in Bossier City, with a transmitter based in Mooringsport (with an auxiliary backup transmitter outside downtown Shreveport).

Former studio locations include the Jefferson Building (near downtown Shreveport), the Alexander Avenue building (near Centenary College), and presently the Louisiana Boardwalk in Bossier City.

The Jefferson Building also housed the 25 kW transmitter and 110 foot tower (HAAT), but winds from a bad storm toppled the tower directly on top of the building.

Another studio was located near the Centenary Gold Dome near Kings Highway with Smokey Hyde as a family-owned radio station. The station was sold or exchanged hands to many different companies over a five-year period, including AM FM Radio, Capstar, Gulf Star, Pacific Star, and Jacor. Clear Channel then sold off to Cumulus Media. During the Jacor/Clear Channel nationwide strategy to buy any and all stations available in the early 2000s, it was ruled by the FCC that Clear Channel could not acquire more than 50 percent of the Shreveport market share and had to sell off the old AM/FM stations, which included KRMD 101.1, KRMD 1340 AM, KVMA 107.9 FM (now 102.9) and KMJJ 99.7 FM.

The studio moved to the Louisiana Boardwalk in 2005 when construction of the boardwalk was near completion. Lightning had plagued the Alexander Avenue building and equipment many times. The boardwalk move with Cumulus Media made the stations and studios completely digital, with new equipment making it a new modern showcase studio.

Engineers CJ Jones, Gary, Kline, Gary Zocolo, Dave Supplee, James Kester, Hal Stinnett and Jasen Bragg designed and built the studios at the Louisiana Boardwalk above the New Orleans Style Copeland's Cheesecake Bistro.

References

External links
KRMD-FM - official website

Radio stations in Louisiana
Country radio stations in the United States
Cumulus Media radio stations